American Business Media is an association of business information providers that was founded in 1906. Currently, the association has more than 300 member companies and gives business intelligence to industry, Madison Avenue, Wall Street and the Beltway, having almost 5,000 print and online titles as well as 1,000 trade shows. 

ABM also sponsors the annual Jesse H. Neal Awards, rewarding editorial skills in business-to-business publications.

References 

Business intelligence organizations
Trade associations based in the United States